Hollman is a surname. Notable people with the surname include:

Ellen Hollman (born 1983), American actress
Julie Hollman (born 1977), British heptathlete
Ka'dar Hollman (born 1996), American football player

See also
Cape Hollman, a headland of Papua New Guinea
Holman (disambiguation)